Abdul Rauf Benawa (1913–1985; Pashto: عبدالرووف بېنوا) was an Afghan writer, poet, journalist, historian and social activist. One of his major works is a series of educational poems called "Sad Reflection" (1957). He died in exile in the United States.

Benawa wrote many works of literature. Some are:

1941: There is no time (nelarem Wacht ")
1942: Virgin unfortunate (Nâmurâda ndželej ")
1947: Literary Theory (Adabi funun ")
1948: Thoughts sorrowful (Prêsâna afkâr ")
1961: Contemporary Writers (likwâl Hosanna ")
1966: Mystery of the heart ("The zrre chwâla)

Sources 

Danțiș, Gabriela - Scriitori străini, Editura Științifică și Enciclopedică București, 1981
Сайт, Detailed Biography in Russian

External links
A site dedicated to the memory of Benawa (in Pashto)

1913 births
1987 deaths
20th-century Afghan poets
Afghan exiles
Afghan emigrants to the United States